Puttapa or Puttapa Station is a pastoral lease that operates as a sheep station.

The area that covered by Puttapa was once part of a much larger lease taken up by John Haimes in 1854 which eventually became Beltana Station. The area was known as the Puttapa paddock and was eventually sold to Steven Lock in 1911 and became Puttapa Station.

The land occupying the extent of the Puttapa pastoral lease was gazetted by the Government of South Australia as a locality in April 2013 under the name Puttapa.

Heritage listings

Puttapa Station contains a number of heritage-listed sites:

 Copper King Copper and Ochre Mine
 Ajax Mine Fossil Reef (designated place of palaeontological and geological significance)

See also
List of ranches and stations

References

Stations (Australian agriculture)
Pastoral leases in South Australia
Far North (South Australia)